The Lawrence County Bank Building is a historic bank building located at 100 West Commercial Street in Pierce City, Lawrence County, Missouri.

Description and history 
It was built in 1892, and is a rectangular, two-story, Romanesque Revival style buff brick building. It measures 25 feet by 100 feet. It features pairs of round arched windows and a prominent round arched, rusticated stone corner entrance surround. The building was heavily damaged during a tornado in May 2003.

It was listed on the National Register of Historic Places on March 10, 2005.

References

Bank buildings on the National Register of Historic Places in Missouri
Romanesque Revival architecture in Missouri
Commercial buildings completed in 1892
Buildings and structures in Lawrence County, Missouri
National Register of Historic Places in Lawrence County, Missouri